The 2020 Lehigh Mountain Hawks football team represented Lehigh University in the 2020–21 NCAA Division I FCS football season. The Mountain Hawks were led by second-year head coach Tom Gilmore and played their home games at Goodman Stadium. They competed as a member of the Patriot League.

On July 13, 2020, the Patriot League announced that it would cancel its fall sports seasons due to the COVID-19 pandemic. The league announced a spring schedule on February 5, with the first games set to be played on March 13.

Schedule
Lehigh had games scheduled against Columbia, on September 19 and Yale, on October 3, which were later canceled before the start of the 2020 season.

References

Lehigh
Lehigh Mountain Hawks football seasons
College football winless seasons
Lehigh Mountain Hawks football